Fortsville is a historic home located near Grizzard, Sussex County, Virginia.  Its present form consists of a two-story, three bay, front gabled central section flanked by one-story, two bay wings, with a center section extension completed in 1792.  The frame dwelling is set on a brick foundation.  Fortsville was the home of statesman John Y. Mason (1799–1859).

It was listed on the National Register of Historic Places in 1970.

Legends and ghost stories 
The plantation estate has been featured in Ghost Hunters off season episode “Ghosts of the Confederacy”. The plantation house is rumored to be on top of an ancient Tunica Indian burial ground and is supposedly home to 18 ghosts. During the 1877 uprising sparked by the American Civil War the slaves overtook over the main house and murdered 6 confederate ground keepers. Allegedly after the death of William Drew Winter, the head grounds keeper, he staggered inside the house and died trying to climb the stairs. He died on the 17th step of the stairs. To the present day, visitors, still hear his dying footsteps.

References

External links
Owner's website

Houses on the National Register of Historic Places in Virginia
National Register of Historic Places in Sussex County, Virginia
Houses in Sussex County, Virginia